Millerton is a village in Dutchess County, New York, United States with a population of 903 at the 2020 census. The village was named after Sidney Miller, a rail contractor who helped  bring the railroad to that area.

Millerton is part of the Poughkeepsie-Newburgh-Middletown Metropolitan Statistical Area of New York as well as the larger New York-Newark-Bridgeport NY-NJ-CT-PA Combined Statistical Area.

Millerton was named one of "The Ten Coolest Small Towns in America" by Frommer's Budget Travel Magazine in 2007, and has been featured in the New York Times article "Williamsburg on the Hudson".

Millerton is within the town of North East and is near Taconic State Park and the Connecticut border.

History
The community of Millerton formed after 1851, and the village was incorporated in 1875.

Irondale

The Millerton Iron Company established itself nearby in an area known as Irondale and was served by a telegraph address in Millerton. The foundry had two Cooper hot blast stoves and produced car-wheel pig iron (cast iron for railcar wheels) with a 12,000 ton capacity in 1890. The plant was established in 1854 and by 1882 employed approximately 150 people. Irondale was served by a general store, company owned grist mill, and post office. A historical marker commemorates the Irondales Cemetery (List of New York State Historic Markers in Dutchess County, New York).

Economic cycle and development
Millerton's life cycle is explained in the New York Times article "Williamsburg on the Hudson" from the perspective of a lifelong-citizen, Phil Terni, who has lived in Millerton for more than 65 years. Terni describes Millerton's early prosperity as "an agricultural crossroads with three hotels served by three railroads", and then described the village's decline as the milk processing plant shut down and the farms had started shutting down.

Millerton's revival as "a rural village with urban influences from nearby towns and boroughs" is shown through the vibrant arts, culture and new small businesses along U.S. Route 44.  

This revival has not been inclusive of everyone, however; many residents - from generational families to newer residents - have been priced out of the area due to gentrification within the village and rising home prices.  There is also a lack of living wage jobs in the area, which makes living in the village further out of reach.

Services are somewhat limited; there is no grocery store within the village, and many of the businesses cater to tourism and are not amenities that low or middle income residents can use.

Geography
Millerton is located in northeastern Dutchess County.

The closest rail station is now Wassaic station to the south. The town formerly had its own station on the Harlem Line.

Demographics

As of the census of 2000, there were 925 people, 375 households, and 232 families residing in the village. The population density was 1,470.4 people per square mile (566.9/km2). There were 412 housing units at an average density of 654.9 per square mile (252.5/km2). The racial makeup of the village was 76.51% White, 2.27% African American, 0.32% Native American, 1.30% Asian, 0.11% Pacific Islander, 1.41% from other races, and 1.08% from two or more races. Hispanic or Latino of any race were 19% of the population.

There were 375 households, out of which 29.3% had children under the age of 18 living with them, 45.3% were married couples living together, 12.5% had a female householder with no husband present, and 38.1% were non-families. 32.0% of all households were made up of individuals, and 14.4% had someone living alone who was 65 years of age or older. The average household size was 2.44 and the average family size was 3.09.

In the village, the population was spread out, with 24.4% under the age of 18, 8.3% from 18 to 24, 27.8% from 25 to 44, 24.0% from 45 to 64, and 15.5% who were 65 years of age or older. The median age was 40 years. For every 100 females, there were 88.8 males. For every 100 females age 18 and over, there were 89.9 males.

The median income for a household in the village was $36,176, and the median income for a family was $46,458. Males had a median income of $27,279 versus $29,500 for females. The per capita income for the village was $17,220. About 7.7% of families and 14.3% of the population were below the poverty line, including 24.7% of those under age 18 and 12.0% of those age 65 or over.

Arts and culture
The village has a number of restaurants and eateries, such as Golden Wok, Taro's, Candy-O's Sweet Shop, the Oakhurst Diner, and The Harney Tea Cafe. The North East Community Center Farmer's Market runs every Saturday from May-October and every other Saturday from November-April.

Millerton has a number of art galleries, artist studios, and antique shops.  The NorthEast-Millerton Library, located on Main Street, hosts a variety of art shows throughout the year, as well as concerts during the summer.

Oblong Books, the T-Shirt Farm and the Music Cellar are popular spots in town for locals and weekenders.

The community is served by The Millerton News, which is published weekly.

Notable people
 Eddie Collins, Hall of Fame baseball player for the Chicago White Sox and the Philadelphia Athletics
 Daryl Hall, singer-songwriter and founder of Daryl's House

References

External links

 Village of Millerton official website

North East, New York
Poughkeepsie–Newburgh–Middletown metropolitan area
Villages in Dutchess County, New York
Villages in New York (state)
Mining communities in New York (state)